Westphalia Township may refer to the following places:

 Westphalia Township, Shelby County, Iowa
 Westphalia Township, Anderson County, Kansas
 Westphalia Township, Clinton County, Michigan

See also

Westphalia (disambiguation)

Township name disambiguation pages